Euphylidorea aperta is a Palearctic species of cranefly in the family Limoniidae. It is found in  a wide range of habitats and micro habitats: in earth rich with humus, in swamps and marshes, in leaf litter, and in wet spots within the woods.

References

External links
Ecology of Commanster

Limoniidae